Tevin Ferris (born 24 July 1996 in New Zealand) is a New Zealand born, Australian rugby union player who plays for the  in Global Rapid Rugby and the Super Rugby AU competition. His original playing position is flanker. He was named in the Force squad for the Global Rapid Rugby competition in 2020.

Reference list

External links
Rugby.com.au profile
itsrugby.co.uk profile

1996 births
New Zealand rugby union players
Australian rugby union players
Living people
Rugby union flankers
Perth Spirit players
Western Force players
Skyactivs Hiroshima players
Rugby union players from Hamilton, New Zealand